Chaoborus maculipes is a species of phantom midges (flies in the family Chaoboridae).

References

External links

 

Chaoboridae
Articles created by Qbugbot
Insects described in 1965